The Ohio State Buckeyes women's ice hockey program represented The Ohio State University during the 2015-16 NCAA Division I women's ice hockey season.

Recruiting

Roster

2015–16 Buckeyes

Schedule

|-
!colspan=12 style=""| Regular Season

|-
!colspan=12 style=""| WCHA Tournament

References

Ohio State
Ohio State Buckeyes women's ice hockey seasons
Ohio State
Ohio State Buckeyes
Ohio State Buckeyes